Molla Hasani may refer to:
 Molla Hasani, Hormozgan

See also
 Molla Hasan (disambiguation)